Corporal first class is a military rank in use by many militaries and is usually a non-commissioned officer.

Singapore
Corporal first class (CFC) is the highest enlistee rank in the Singapore Armed Forces, ranking above corporal. This honourable rank is conferred on proficient and competent corporals by recommendation to the formation or division HQ. Since CFCs are groomed to be Strategic Corporals, they are usually given higher appointments or other equivalent responsibilities.

The rank was first introduced in the Singapore Armed Forces on 1 September 1988. At that time, its insignia was indicated by two downward chevrons on the arm, with a horizontal bar above the chevrons. However, the CFC rank was phased out from the NS ranks shortly after the revamp of the NS sergeant ranks in the 1990s. Reintroduced in 2008, the CFC rank insignia was redesigned with an additional arc on top of the rank insignia for a corporal.

Gallery

Army

Navy

Air force

Marines

See also
 Corporal
 Singapore Armed Forces ranks

References

Military ranks of Singapore